The 1982–83 European Cup was the 18th edition of the European Cup, IIHF's premier European club ice hockey tournament. The season started on October 12, 1982, and finished on August 28, 1983.

The tournament was won by CSKA Moscow, who won the final group.

First round

 HK Jesenice,   
 HC Bolzano,   
 Flyers Heerenveen,  
 AIK    :  bye

Second round

 Tappara,   
 SB Rosenheim,   
 Dukla Jihlava,  
 CSKA Moscow    :  bye

Third round

Final Group
(Tampere, Finland)

Final group standings

References 
 Season 1983

1982–83 in European ice hockey
IIHF European Cup